A spectrum problem arises when considering either of two related concepts in mathematical logic:

 Spectrum of a theory
 Spectrum of a sentence